The Blue Hen Mall (now the Blue Hen Corporate Center) is a defunct shopping mall on Bay Road in Dover, Delaware. The mall opened in August 1968, and was the main mall in the Dover area until the Dover Mall opened in 1982, leading to its decline. In the 1990s, the mall was converted into a corporate center. The mall has now been converted into a combination of medical care and state office facility. Tenants include DE Department of Labor, VA Outpatient Offices, and Bayhealth Medical Center.

History

The Blue Hen Mall opened in the late 1960s, at which time it was the only enclosed mall in Delaware. The opening of the retail hub shifted several businesses away from downtown Dover. JCPenney relocated from Loockerman Street in downtown Dover to an anchor space at the mall in 1968. Woolco also anchored the shopping center. This store was shuttered in early 1983. It soon reopened as a Roses variety store. At its height, Blue Hen Mall housed over 50 shops. 

Sears was interested in relocating to the Blue Hen Mall from downtown Dover, but could not agree with management as to where to place the store in the shopping center. As a result, Sears decided to relocate, along with other department stores, to the new Dover Mall which opened in 1982. Following the opening of the Dover Mall, many stores relocated from the Blue Hen Mall, turning it into a dead mall. It was also called by some of the local people as the "Blue Hen Chicken Mall." It was mainly used in the late 1980s when the mall was not popular anymore.  At this time, the Blue Hen Mall was owned by Jardel Company, Inc. and Penn Mutual. Roses closed its Blue Hen Mall location in 1991. JCPenney relocated from the Blue Hen Mall to the Dover Mall in August 1993.

In the 1990s, the Blue Hen Mall was converted into the Blue Hen Corporate Center, with the retail space becoming office space. A Bank of America call center and an Aetna office facility served as the anchors of the corporate center. The Bank of America call center eventually closed and Aetna left the Blue Hen Corporate Center in 2009. In 2008, the property was sold by Blue Hen Venture LLC to Pettinaro Enterprises LLC for $17.4 million. Currently, the Blue Hen Corporate Center has several office vacancies.

In September 2013 Bayhealth rented the space and relocated all of its information services resources from Kent General Hospital and Milford Memorial Hospital to the former Aetna space. Bayhealth did a complete renovation of the space, including new office furniture, computers and phone systems for its employees and contracting staff. 24x7 helpdesk for the entire hospital system is operated out of this new space as well.

In January 2022 Bayhealth announced that is had completed acquisition of the 2 original anchor store spaces (JCPenney & Woolco/Roses) and plans to renovate and create a "Dover Medical Neighborhood with specialty clinical services and administration space.”.  The former Bank of America call center was recently used for the Governor's Central Delaware Career Expo in 2022.  The building showed signs that a renovation was going to begin soon.

List of anchor stores

References
   

Shopping malls in Delaware
Defunct shopping malls in the United States
Buildings and structures in Dover, Delaware
Shopping malls established in 1968
Office buildings in Delaware
1968 establishments in Delaware